The Military Intelligence Directorate, is the military intelligence service of Syria. Although its roots go back to the French mandate period (1923–1943), its current organization was established in 1969. Its predecessor organisation was called the Deuxième Bureau (the Second Bureau). It is headquartered at the Defense Ministry in Damascus.

The military intelligence service, or the Mukhabarat in Arabic, is very influential in Syrian politics and is controlled by the President, Bashar al-Assad. It is suspected of providing support to different radical groups. The service also monitors opponents of the government outside Syria. During the Syrian occupation of Lebanon, the Mukhabarat exercised political authority in Lebanon.

List of heads 
Ali Zaza (1965-1970)
Hikmat al-Shihabi (1970–1973) 
Deputy director: Ali Duba 
Ali Duba (1973–2000) 
Deputy director: Hassan Khalil (1993–2000)
Hassan Khalil (2000–2005)
Deputy director: Assef Shawkat (2000–2005)
Assef Shawkat (2005–2009)
Deputy director: Saeed Sammour (2005–2009)
Abdel-Fatah Qudsiyeh (2009–July 2012)
Head of Internal Affairs (branch 293): Rafiq Shahadah (2011)
Rafiq Shahadah (July 2012–March 2015)
Mohamed Mahala (March 2015–July 2019)
Kifah Moulhem (July 2019–Present)

Regional Heads of Military Intelligence 
Damascus countryside (branch 227): Maj. Gen. Rustum Ghazali (past–July 2012), the European Union sanctioned him for being involved in violence against the civilian population during the Syrian uprising. Accused of ordering or committing crimes against humanity by Human Rights Watch.
Damascus (branch 215): Brig. Gen. Sha’afiq (2012) accused of ordering or committing crimes against humanity.
Damascus (branch 235 a.k.a. "Palestine Branch"): Brig. Gen. Muhammad Khallouf (2012) accused of ordering or committing crimes against humanity.
Damascus (branch 291): Brig. Gen. Yousef Abdou (2012) accused of ordering or committing crimes against humanity.
Damascus (branch 291): Brig. Gen. Burhan Qadour (past–2012) accused of ordering or committing crimes against humanity.
Hama city branch: Mohammad Mufleh (2011), the European Union sanctioned him for being involved in the crackdown on demonstrators during the Syrian uprising.
Deir ez-Zor branch: Jami Jami (2011), the European Union sanctioned him for being directly involved in repression and violence against the civilian population in Dayr az-Zor and alboukamal during the Syrian uprising.
Idlib (branch 271): Brig. Gen. Nawful Al-Husayn (2011), the European Union sanctioned him for being directly involved in repression and violence against the civilian population in Idlib province during the Syrian uprising. Accused of ordering or committing crimes against humanity.
Homs branch: Muhammed Zamrini (2011), the European Union sanctioned him for being directly involved in repression and violence against the civilian population in Homs during the Syrian uprising. Accused of ordering or committing crimes against humanity.
Daraa (branch 245): Col. Lu’ai al-Ali (2011), the European Union sanctioned him for being responsible for the violence against protesters in Daraa during the Syrian uprising. Accused of ordering or committing crimes against humanity.
Suwayda branch: Wafiq Nasser (2011), head of regional branch assumed position after Brig. Gen. Suheir Ramadan.
Aleppo branch: Muhammad Duba (1974-1979)

Paramilitary units 
 Military Security Shield Forces
Military Security Falcons
 Southern Shield Brigade
 Desert Commandos Regiment
 Lions of Hamidiya
Forces of the Fighters of the Tribes
Falcons of the Euphrates

Other Syrian intelligence agencies 
Air Force Intelligence Directorate
General Intelligence Directorate
Political Security Directorate

References

External links
Syria's Intelligence Services: Origins and Development, Andrew Rathmell, J. Conflict Studies, 1996.
Human Rights in Syria, James A. Paul, Middle East Watch, 1990.
Syria's Intelligence Services, Agentura.

Syrian intelligence agencies
Politics of Lebanon
Military intelligence agencies
Military of Syria